Percoidei is one of 3 suborders of bony fishes in the order Perciformes. Many commercially harvested fish species are considered to be contained in this suborder, including the snappers, groupers, basses, goatfishes and perches.

Divisions
The Percoidei are further divided into three superfamilies which contain over 50 families and hundreds of genera.

 Suborder Percoidei
 Percoidea                 
 Centropomidae (Snooks)
 Latidae (Lates)
 Gerreidae (Mojarras)
 Centrogenyidae (False scorpionfishes)
 Perciliidae (Southern basses)
 Howellidae (Oceanic basslets)
 Acropomatidae (Lanternbellies)
 Epigonidae (Deepwater cardinalfishes)
 Polyprionidae (Wreckfishes)
 Lateolabracidae (Asian seaperches)
 Mullidae (Goatfishes)
 Glaucosomatidae (Pearl perches)
 Pempheridae (Sweepers)
 Oplegnathidae (Knifejaws)
 Kuhliidae (Flagtails)
 Leptobramidae (Beachsalmon)
 Bathyclupeidae (Bathyclupeids)
 Polynemidae (Threadfins)
 Toxotidae (Archerfishes)
 Arripidae (Australasian salmon (kahawai))
 Dichistiidae (Galjoen fishes)
 Kyphosidae (Sea chubs)
 Terapontidae (grunters or tigerperches)
 Percichthyidae (temperate perches)
 Sinipercidae (Chinese perches)
 Enoplosidae (Oldwives)
 Pentacerotidae (Armourheads)
 Dinopercidae (Cavebasses)
 Banjosiidae (Banjofishes)
 Centrarchidae (Sunfishes)
 Serranidae (Sea basses)
 Percidae (Perches)
 Lactariidae (False trevallies)
 Dinolestidae (Long-finned pikes)
 Scombropidae (Gnomefishes)
 Pomatomidae (Bluefishes)
 Bramidae (Pomfrets)
 Caristiidae (Manefishes)
Possibly related to Acanthuriformes  
 Monodactylidae (Moonfishes)
 Priacanthidae (Bigeyes (catalufas))
Seven families which may have a relationship to Acanthuroidei, Monodactylidae, and Priacanthidae
 Leiognathidae (Ponyfishes, slimys, or slipmouths)
 Chaetodontidae (Butterflyfishes)
 Pomacanthidae (Angelfishes)
 Malacanthidae (Tilefishes)   
 Haemulidae (Grunts)
 Hapalogenyidae (Barbeled grunters)
 Lutjanidae (Snappers)
 Caesionidae (Fusiliers)
 Superfamily Cirrhitoidea
 Cirrhitidae (Hawkfishes)
 Chironemidae (Kelpfishes)
 Aplodactylidae (Marblefishes)
 Cheilodactylidae (Morwongs)
 Latridae (Trumpeters)
Superfamily Cepoloidea
 Cepolidae (Bandfishes)
Superfamily Siganoidea
 Scatophagidae (Scats)
 Siganidae (Rabbitfishes)
 incertae sedis
 † Labrax 
 † L. lepidotus 
 † L. major 
 † L. schizurus 
 † L. vogdtii

References 

 
Perciformes
Ray-finned fish suborders